Jayda Cheyni Hylton-Pelaia (born 30 May 1998) is a footballer who plays as a full-back for League1 Ontario club Woodbridge Strikers and the Jamaica women's national team. Born in Canada, she represents Jamaica at international level.

Early life
Hylton-Pelaia was born in Brampton, Ontario, Canada. Her father, Gary Hylton, was born in Jamaica and lived there until he was a teenager and her mother, Tracy Pelaia, is Italian. She began playing soccer at the age of eight with Brams United SC and joined the youth teams of Woodbridge Strikers while in high school. Hylton-Pelaia attended St. Augustine Catholic Secondary School in Brampton, where she was a team captain and two-time most valuable player during her four years with the Falcons.

College
Hylton-Pelaia attended East Carolina University in Greenville, North Carolina, United States.

International career
Although she was born in Canada, Hylton-Pelaia was also able to represent Jamaica, through her father, and Italy, through her mother. She was first called up by Jamaica at the under-20 level, named to the squad for the 2018 CONCACAF Women's U-20 Championship. Hylton-Pelaia made her debut in the lead-up to the tournament, starting a friendly against Costa Rica in January. At the championship, she started the Group B finale and played the entirety of a draw against Nicaragua.

Senior career, 2019–present
At the senior level, Hylton-Pelaia was called up for the first time at the 2019 Pan American Games. She earned her debut senior cap in the Group A opener against Mexico and went on to play in every minute of the tournament as Jamaica finished in seventh place. Following the end of the Games, head coach Hue Menzies said that Hylton-Pelaia "did well" and that she would be in consideration for future call-ups during the 2020 Summer Olympics qualifying process.

However, due to injury and the effects of the COVID-19 pandemic, Hylton-Pelaia did not appear for Jamaica for three years. Her next call was for the 2022 CONCACAF W Championship.

Career statistics

Club

International

References

External links

 East Carolina profile
 Arizona State profile
 
 

1998 births
Living people
Canadian sportspeople of Italian descent
Canadian sportspeople of Jamaican descent
Citizens of Jamaica through descent
Jamaican people of Italian descent
Jamaican women's footballers
Soccer players from Brampton
East Carolina University alumni
Arizona State University alumni
Women's association football fullbacks
Woodbridge Strikers (women) players
East Carolina Pirates women's soccer players
Arizona State Sun Devils women's soccer players
Chicago Red Stars draft picks
Jamaica women's international footballers
Pan American Games competitors for Jamaica
Footballers at the 2019 Pan American Games
Jamaican expatriate women's footballers
Expatriate women's soccer players in the United States
Jamaican expatriate sportspeople in the United States